is a Japanese idol and singer. She is a member of the Japanese idol girl group AKB48 and a former member of NMB48 and NGT48. She auditioned for AKB48 on December 3, 2006, and is now a member of AKB48's Team B. She was previously the captain of Team B before she was replaced by Ayaka Umeda as the captain. She was also a member of AKB48 sub-group French Kiss. Her talent agency is Watanabe Productions. Her nickname is Yukirin.

In the annual AKB48 general elections, Yuki has consistently ranked among the group's top members. She placed ninth in 2009, eighth in 2010, third in 2011 and 2012, fourth in 2013, third in 2014, second in 2015 and fifth in 2016.

Career

Kashiwagi was born in Kagoshima, Japan. In October 2005, she auditioned for AKB48 and made it to the final judging but had to resign because her father objected and could not go to Tokyo. She later auditioned for idol group Morning Musume but was not selected. She joined AKB48 after an audition again on December 3, 2006, and made her debut as a member of Team B at the "AKB48 1st Anniversary Live – Seizoroi da ze! AKB!" concert. Before her theater debut, as part of the "AKB48 Haru no Chotto Dake Zenkoku Tour – Madamada da ze 48" tour, she appeared in Yuko Oshima's position on March 17 at the Aichi Welfare Pension Hall and on March 18 at the Fukuoka International Conference Hall. Her first AKB48 theater performance as a Team B member was on April 4, 2007. On March 25, 2009, she joined Watanabe Productions. On April 25, 2009, she became a weathergirl on Tokyo Broadcasting System TV's "Hiruobi". She came 9th place in the member elections for the single "Iiwake Maybe" and was made captain of Team B on August 23, 2009. Her first solo photobook was released on September 20, 2009. In 2010, she was made a member of three-piece AKB48 sub-group French Kiss. During the AKB48 third general election in 2011, she was ranked third place by popular votes, after Yuko Oshima and Atsuko Maeda.

Umeda Ayaka replaced Kashiwagi as the Captain of Team B, during the reformation of teams at the Tokyo Dome Concert held on August 24, 2012.

On February 6, 2013, Kashiwagi made a solo debut on her personal label "YukiRing", with the single "Shortcake".

In the annual general elections held in 2013, Kashiwagi came in fourth place with a total of 96,905 votes.

She then released her second solo single, "Birthday Wedding" on October 16, 2013.

In AKB48 Group Daisokaku Matsuri, held February 24, 2014, she became a member of NMB48's Team N while remaining in AKB48's Team B. She made her first appearance as a member of NMB48 during the group's solo concert in Saitama Super Arena on April 5, 2014. She made her debut at the NMB48 theater on April 30, 2014.

In the group's annual general elections in 2014, Kashiwagi came in third place with a total of 104,364 votes.

Kashiwagi received her first center position for the group's 39th single, Green Flash since her debut in 2006. This single has two centers, the other center being Haruna Kojima.

On March 26, 2015, it was announced that she would release from her concurrent position in NMB48, and hold a concurrent position in NGT48 which is planned to be formed in 2015. She placed No.2 in the AKB48 general election in 2015, and was selected for the 41st single senbatsu members. On April 17, she announced that she was withdrawing from NGT48, with a final performance at Team NIII's concert on April 21, 2019.

On April 9, 2021, it was announced that Kashiwagi would temporarily join all seven current WACK groups as a member, with the stage name Yuki Reysole. On August 31, all seven WACK groups will release a single each, all of which will feature Kashiwagi. The release of the singles was later delayed indefinitely following Kashiwagi's diagnosis of Syringomyelia. All seven of the singles were released on November 30.

On June 9, 2021, it was announced that Kashiwagi will be undergoing spinal cord surgery. As a result, her solo concerts for July 7-8 have been postponed.

Discography

Singles

As solo artist

Collaborations

Stage units

 Team B 1st Stage (Seishun Girls)
 Kinjirareta Futari
 Fushidara na Natsu

Team B 2nd Stage (Aitakatta)
 Namida no Shonan
 Rio no Kakumei
 Koi no Plan
 Senaka Kara Dakishimete

Team B 3rd Stage (Pajama Drive)
 Temodemo no Namida

Team B 4th Stage (Idol no Yoake)
 Kuchi Utsushi no Chocolate

Team B 5th Stage (Theater no Megami)
 Yokaze no Shiwaza

Umeda Team B Waiting Stage
 Namida ni Shizumu Taiyou

Team B 3rd Stage (Pajama Drive) – REVIVAL
 Junjou Shugi

Team N 4th Stage (Koko ni Datte Tenshi wa Iru)
 Zipper
 Hajimete no Hoshi
 100nen Saki Demo

Appearances

Dramas
  (2010) – Black
  (2011) – Kashiwagi Yuki
  (2011) – Black
  (2011) – Kishinosato Juri
  (2013) – Kashiwagi Yuki
 "So long!" (2013) – Goto Midori
  (2013) – Inoue Sae
  (2013) – Ejima Chihiro
  (2013)
  (2013) – Ayukawa Tamaki
  (2014) – Miki
  (2015) – Black (ep.2)
  Ep.13 - Rapidly (2015) – Sana
  Ep.1 - First Time in the Morning (2016) – Miki Kirimoto
  (2016) – Kashiwagi (Anago) (ep.4 - 5)
 Segodon (2018) – Saigō Sono

Variety
  (2008)
  (2008)
 "AKBingo!" (2008-2019) (Irregular appearances)
  (2009- )
  (2009- ) (Irregular appearances)
  (Irregular appearances)
 "AKB48 SHOW!" (2013-2019)
  (2014-2015)

Anime
 Tales of the Abyss (October, 2008 – March, 2009, MBS)
 Sket Dance (April, 2011 – March 2012, TV Tokyo)

Musicals
 ∞・Infinity (2009) – Takashima Maria (Double cast with Minami Takahashi)

Radio
 AKB48 Ashita Made Mou Chotto (April 28, 2008 –, Nippon Cultural Broadcasting)
 ON8 (April 20, 2009 –, bayfm)
 Holiday Special bayfm meets AKB48 3rd Stage ~Real~ (September 15, 2008, bayfm)
 AKB48 Konya wa Kaeranai (November 29, 2008 – Chubu-Nippon Broadcasting)
 Kashiwagi Yuki no YUKIRIN TIME (2012- )
 AKB48 no All Night Nippon (Irregular appearances)
 Listen? ~Live 4 Life~ (Irregular appearances)
 ON8+1 (Irregular appearances)

Concerts
 with AKB48
 AKB48 Request Hour Set List Best 100 (January 21–24, 2008)
 Live DVD wa Derudarou kedo, Yappari Name ni Kagiruze (August 23, 2008)
 AKB48 Masaka, Kono Concert no Ongen wa Ryuushutsu shinai yo ne? (November 23, 2008)
 End of the Year Thanksgiving: We're going to shuffle AKB! Give your regards to SKE as well (20 December 2008)
 AKB48 Request Hour Set List Best 100 2009 (January 18, 2009)
 AKB48 Bunshin no Jutsu Tour (August 15, 2009)
 AKB48 Natsu no Saruobasan Matsuri (September 13, 2009)

 Solo
 Kashiwagi Yuki 3rd Solo Live Nete no Samete mo Yukirin World ~Motto Muchuu ni Sasechauzo♡~ (2013 concert, 2014 DVD/BD)

Bibliography

Magazines
 Weekly Young Jump, Shueisha 1979-, since 2010

Photobooks
 Kashiwagi Yuki First Photobook Ijō, Kashiwagi Yuki Deshita (September 28, 2009, Tokyo News Service) 
 ミニマムAKB48柏木由紀  Minimum AKB48 Yuki Kashiwagi (20 october 2011, rokusaisha)  
 Kashiwagi Yuki Second Photobook Yu, Yu, Yukirin... (April 19, 2012, Shueisha)

Advertising 

 AKB48 X RAVIJOUR (Yuiri Murayama, Yuki Kashiwagi and Miu Shitao as its new brand ambassadors)

References

External links

 , Kashiwagi's vanity label under Avex Group 
 Yuki Kashiwagi profile at AKB48 Official Site 
 Yuki Kashiwagi at Oricon 

1991 births
Living people
Japanese idols
People from Kagoshima
AKB48 members
NMB48 members
NGT48 members
Avex Group artists
Musicians from Kagoshima Prefecture
French Kiss (band)
Watanabe Entertainment
21st-century Japanese women singers
21st-century Japanese singers